The Tokai Maru was a Japanese passenger-cargo ship built by the Mitsubishi Heavy Industries shipyard that was sunk in Apra Harbor, Guam, in 1943, during World War II.  It had served as a fast ship service between New York City and Japan for Osaka Shosen Co. before World War II;  during the war it was used as a military transport ship for the Imperial Japanese Navy.

History 
Construction by Mitsubishi Heavy Industries began in 1929, the ship was launched on May 16, 1930, construction was completed on August 14, 1930. Osaka Shosen Co., now Mitsui O.S.K. Lines, used her as a fast luxury freighter for Tokyo-New York City service through the Panama Canal. In July 1941, the United States closed the Panama Canal to Japanese shipping in retaliation for the Japanese invasion of French Indochina. Tokai Maru, on the eastern side of the Canal, was forced to sail back to Japan through the Strait of Magellan. The ship was then requisitioned as a war-time transport freighter, a class of ships known as Ippan Choyosen that were not officially part of the Imperial Japanese Navy and had civilian crews. The ship went under contract to the Japanese Navy at the Kure Naval Arsenal on October 17, 1941. She was tasked with transporting men and material throughout the Pacific. She would have been armed with 2x12cm guns, 2xtwin 25mm guns, and 2xsingle 25mm guns.

On January 24, 1943, USS Flying Fish spotted Tokai Maru in Apra Harbor, Guam, a U.S. territory then occupied by Japan. After waiting for three days for Tokai Maru to leave the harbor, Flying Fish fired two torpedoes at Tokai, running at 15-foot depth. One ran aground but the other struck Tokai, inflicting significant damage, but did not sink her. Seven months later, in August 1943, USS Snapper spotted Tokai Maru and another vessel moored in the northeast corner of Apra Harbor. She waited seven days for the Japanese ships to leave before sailing to the north of the harbor on August 27, 1943, and firing three torpedoes at the first target and one at the second. One torpedo hit Tokai'''s port side #3 cargo hold, sinking her directly on top of the wreck of SMS Cormoran II, a World War I German merchant raider.

The Tokai Maru shipwreck,  under water, is listed on the U.S. National Register of Historic Places, as is the shipwreck of SMS Cormoran II'', which it lies beside.  It is one of the few places where divers can explore a World War I shipwreck next to a ship from World War II.

In 1988 the wreck was placed on the National Register of Historic Places because of its association with World War II.

References

See also
 
 Foreign commerce and shipping of Empire of Japan
 Underwater diving on Guam

National Register of Historic Places in Guam
1930 ships
Ships built by Mitsubishi Heavy Industries
Auxiliary ships of the Imperial Japanese Navy
Shipwrecks on the National Register of Historic Places
World War II on the National Register of Historic Places in Guam
Wreck diving sites
Apra Harbor
Underwater diving sites in Guam